Stenopodius is a genus of tortoise beetles and hispines in the family Chrysomelidae. There are about seven described species in Stenopodius.

Species
These seven species belong to the genus Stenopodius:
 Stenopodius flavidus Horn, 1883
 Stenopodius insularis Blaisdell, 1939
 Stenopodius inyoensis Blaisdell, 1939
 Stenopodius lateralis (Schaeffer, 1933)
 Stenopodius martini Blaisdell, 1939
 Stenopodius submaculatus Blaisdell, 1939
 Stenopodius texanus Schaeffer, 1933

References

Further reading

 
 
 
 

Cassidinae
Articles created by Qbugbot